Dorian Çollaku (born 2 June 1977) is an Albanian hammer thrower.

Çollaku was born in Tirana. He competed at the 2004 Summer Olympics. He was placed thirty-first in the qualifying rounds of the competition, with a throw of 70.06 metres. At the 2008 Summer Olympics in Beijing, he successfully threw the hammer into the field on his third and final attempt, at 70.98 metres. Collaku, however, failed to advance into the hammer throw final, as he placed twenty-eighth overall in the qualifying rounds.

Competition record

References

External links

NBC Olympics Profile

Albanian hammer throwers
Male hammer throwers
Living people
Olympic athletes of Albania
Athletes (track and field) at the 2004 Summer Olympics
Athletes (track and field) at the 2008 Summer Olympics
People from Tirana
1977 births
Albanian emigrants to Finland
Albanian male athletes